The 2017–18 Ball State Cardinals women's basketball team will represent Ball State University during the 2017–18 NCAA Division I Women's Basketball Championship season. The Cardinals, led by sixth year head coach Brady Sallee, play their home games at Worthen Arena as members of the West Division of the Mid-American Conference. They finished the season 25–7, 13–5 in MAC play to finish in second place in the West Division. They lost in the quarterfinals of the MAC women's tournament to Western Michigan. They received an automatic bid to the Women's National Invitation Tournament where defeated Middle Tennessee in the first round before losing in the second round to Purdue.

Roster

Schedule

|-
!colspan=9 style="background:#C41E3A; color:#FFFFFF;"| Exhibition

|-
!colspan=9 style="background:#C41E3A; color:#FFFFFF;"| Non-conference regular season
|-

|-

|-
!colspan=9 style=""| MAC regular season

|-

|-

|-

|-

|-

|-

|-

|-

|-

|-

|-

|-

|-

|-

|-

|-

|-

|-
!colspan=9 style=""| 

|-
!colspan=9 style=""| 

|-

|-

Rankings
2017–18 NCAA Division I women's basketball rankings

See also
 2017–18 Ball State Cardinals men's basketball team

References

Ball State
Ball State Cardinals women's basketball seasons
Ball State
Ball State
Ball